Pol Amat Escudé (born 18 June 1978 in Barcelona, Catalonia, Spain) is a Spanish retired field hockey player, who played as a striker. In 2008 he was awarded World Hockey Player of the Year, becoming the first Spaniard to win the award.

Career

National team
Amat made his international debut at the age of 17 in 1995 before being selected for the Atlanta Olympics in 1996. That year, Spain won silver with Amat playing alongside legends such as Juan Escarré and Javier Arnau.

After competing for Spain in both the Sydney 2000 and Athens 2004 Olympics, he won another silver medal in Beijing 2008. He was also part of the Spanish team at the 2012 Summer Olympics.

The striker won his first major title with the Spaniards at the 2004 Champions Trophy in Lahore. Arguably Amat's finest hour came in the final of the 2005 European Nations Cup. With Spain trailing Netherlands 2–1, Santi Freixa grabbed an equaliser with less than three minutes to go. The stage was set for Amat, who produced two goals in less than a minute to seal a 4–2 victory, giving Spain a title that had eluded them for 31 years.

Amat also scored a memorable golden goal at the 2006 World Cup when he brilliantly flicked the ball over the South Korean goalkeeper to claim the bronze medal for Spain.

References

External links
 
 London 2012 profile

1978 births
Male field hockey forwards
Field hockey players at the 1996 Summer Olympics
Field hockey players at the 2000 Summer Olympics
Field hockey players at the 2004 Summer Olympics
Field hockey players at the 2008 Summer Olympics
Living people
Olympic field hockey players of Spain
Olympic silver medalists for Spain
1998 Men's Hockey World Cup players
2002 Men's Hockey World Cup players
2006 Men's Hockey World Cup players
2010 Men's Hockey World Cup players
Spanish male field hockey players
Field hockey players from Barcelona
Field hockey players at the 2012 Summer Olympics
Medalists at the 2008 Summer Olympics
Medalists at the 1996 Summer Olympics
Club Egara players
Real Club de Polo de Barcelona players
Amsterdamsche Hockey & Bandy Club players
Spanish expatriate sportspeople in the Netherlands
Expatriate field hockey players